John Murdoch may refer to:
John Murdoch (teacher) (1747–1824), friend and tutor to Robert Burns
John Smith Murdoch (1862–1945), chief architect of the Commonwealth of Australia
John Murdoch (athlete) (1885–1939), Canadian Olympic athlete
John Murdoch (bishop) (1796–1865), Roman Catholic Vicar Apostolic for Western Scotland
John Murdoch (editor) (1818–1903), Scottish newspaper editor and land reformer
John Murdoch (footballer) (1901–1964), Scottish international footballer
John Murdoch (politician) (1882–1936), Australian politician for the Electoral division of Pembroke
John Murdoch (literary evangelist) (1819–1904), Christian missionary in Ceylon and India
John E. Murdoch (1927–2010), American academic in the field of historical science
John Murdoch (artist) (born 1971), American artist of realism, classical atelier
John Murdoch of Rosebank (1709–1776), Scottish tobacco lord and three times Lord Provost of Glasgow
 The main character in the 1998 sci-fi film Dark City

See also
John Murdock (disambiguation)